Liliane Cristina Barbosa Fernandes Parrela (born 8 October 1987) is a Brazilian sprinter specialising in the 400 metres hurdles. She has won several medals at regional level.

Her personal bests are 52.55 seconds in the 400 metres (Belém 2013) and 57.38 seconds in the 400 metres hurdles (São Paulo 2013).

International competitions

References

1987 births
Living people
Brazilian female sprinters
Athletes (track and field) at the 2015 Pan American Games
South American Games gold medalists for Brazil
South American Games bronze medalists for Brazil
South American Games medalists in athletics
Competitors at the 2014 South American Games
Pan American Games athletes for Brazil
Troféu Brasil de Atletismo winners
21st-century Brazilian women